Berezovka is a rural locality (a selo) and the administrative center of Berezovsky Selsoviet, Krasnogorsky District, Altai Krai, Russia. The population was 1,243 as of 2013. There are 20 streets.

Geography 
Berezovka is located 35 km northwest of Krasnogorskoye (the district's administrative centre) by road. Bystryanka and Obraztsovka are the nearest rural localities.

References 

Rural localities in Krasnogorsky District, Altai Krai